The Sioux City Symphony Orchestra is an American orchestra based in Sioux City, Iowa.  Its home is the Orpheum Theater.

History
The Sioux City Symphony Orchestra and The Sioux City Municipal Band were each formed in the early 1930s under the guidance and direction of Leo Kucinski.  Under Kucinski's leadership, the orchestra gradually developed into a highly respected, paid-professional Class B civic orchestra with a regular performing season.  The orchestra originally performed in the Sioux City Municipal Auditorium, but in 2001 moved to the restored historic Orpheum Theater.

The Municipal Band, with close kinship to the orchestra, is also a paid-professional group that traces its origins to The Monahan Post 64 Band of the American Legion, in the 1920s.  The Monahan Post Band became world-famous when it was selected as the "official" band of the American Legion in the mid-1920s.  From its founding until the early 1930s, The Monahan Post Band made several tours that included concert appearances in New York City, New Orleans and Paris.  The home of the Municipal Band is the city band shell in Grandview Park.

Sioux City's ability to produce highly gifted musicians for fine music of all styles can be attributed to its citizens' very strong and longstanding commitment to and financial investment in music education within the public and private school systems. In the 1930s, Kucinski worked closely with Superintendent of Schools M.G. Clark to create the foundation for its public school music program. Additionally, Morningside College has long been home to a vital and energetic music department, which has served to contribute to the pool of fine musicians and music educators in Sioux City. Sioux City has an All-City Orchestra whose members are elementary grade students who participate by audition, and the Siouxland Youth Symphony, whose players are selected by competitive auditions from the junior schools and high schools in the area.

After Kucinski, other music directors of the orchestra have included Thomas Lewis, Stephen Rogers Radcliffe and Xian Zhang.  Xian Zhang had originally been contracted to the orchestra for 3 years, but resigned after 2 years because of her schedule demands.  In March 2009, the orchestra announced the appointment of Ryan Haskins as its next music director, as of 1 July 2009.

Music Directors
 Leo Kucinski (1925-1977)
 Thomas Lewis (1977- )
 Stephen Rogers Radcliffe (1995-2004)
 Xian Zhang (2005-2007)
 JungHo Kim (2008)
 Ryan Haskins (2009–present)

References

External links
 History of the orchestra from the Sioux City Symphony page
 University of North Dakota Faculty/Staff Newsletter, 16 December 2005, with information on Radcliffe tenure

American orchestras
Wikipedia requested audio of orchestras
Musical groups established in 1925
Performing arts in Iowa
Musical groups from Iowa
Tourist attractions in Sioux City, Iowa